Aaron Fields (born January 9, 1976) is a former American football defensive end in the National Football League for the Dallas Cowboys and Atlanta Falcons. He played college football at Troy State.

Early years
Fields attended Notasulga High School, where he practiced football and basketball. He played as a wide receiver, tight end and linebacker. He received All-area honors in both sports as a senior.

He accepted a football scholarship from Savannah State University. He transferred to Troy State after his sophomore season. As a junior, he tallied 7 tackles (one for loss), one sack and 3 quarterback pressures.

As a senior he was named a starter at defensive end, posting 54 tackles (sixth on the team), 7 sacks, 21 quarterback pressures, 14 tackles for loss, 3 passes defensed, one forced fumble and one fumble recovery.

Professional career

Dallas Cowboys (first stint)
Fields was signed as an undrafted free agent by the Dallas Cowboys after the 2000 NFL Draft, on April 19. He was waived on August 27.

Atlanta Falcons
On August 30, 2000, he was signed by the Atlanta Falcons to their practice squad, where he spent the first 10 weeks of the regular season.

Dallas Cowboys (second stint)
On November 8, 2000, he was signed by the Dallas Cowboys from the Falcons' practice squad, after Chad Hennings was lost for the season with a neck injury. He was declared inactive from week 11 to week 13. He saw action against the Tampa Bay Buccaneers, Washington Redskins and New York Giants. He was deactivated in the season finale. He was released on August 21.

Green Bay Packers
On August 22, 2001, he was claimed off waivers by the Green Bay Packers. He was cut on August 26. On January 24, 2002, he was re-signed. He was released on August 27.

Edmonton Eskimos
On April 2, 2003, he was signed by the Edmonton Eskimos of the Canadian Football League. He was released on June 6.

References

1976 births
Living people
People from Lee County, Alabama
Players of American football from Alabama
American football defensive ends
Savannah State Tigers football players
Troy Trojans football players
Dallas Cowboys players
Atlanta Falcons players